Charles Hazen Peaslee (February 6, 1804 – September 18, 1866) was a U.S. Representative from New Hampshire.

Born in Gilmanton, New Hampshire, Peaslee attended Gilmanton Academy and was graduated from Dartmouth College, Hanover, in 1824. He studied law and was admitted to the bar in 1828, commencing practice in Concord. He served as member of the New Hampshire House of Representatives, 1833–1837, and as adjutant general of the State militia, 1839-1847.

Peaslee was elected as a Democrat to the Thirtieth, Thirty-first, and Thirty-second Congresses (March 4, 1847 – March 3, 1853). He served as chairman of the Committee on Militia (Thirty-first and Thirty-second Congresses). He was not a candidate for renomination in 1852.

He served as collector of the port of Boston by appointment of President Pierce, 1853-1857. He moved to Portsmouth, New Hampshire, in 1860. He died while on a visit to Saint Paul, Minnesota, on September 18, 1866. He was interred in Harmony Grove Cemetery in Portsmouth.

References

1804 births
1866 deaths
Democratic Party members of the New Hampshire House of Representatives
New Hampshire lawyers
Dartmouth College alumni
Politicians from Portsmouth, New Hampshire
Democratic Party members of the United States House of Representatives from New Hampshire
Collectors of the Port of Boston
19th-century American politicians
People from Gilmanton, New Hampshire
Burials in New Hampshire
19th-century American lawyers